Outwoods is a civil parish in the district of East Staffordshire, Staffordshire, England.  The parish contains two listed buildings that are recorded in the National Heritage List for England.  Both the listed buildings are designated at Grade II, the lowest of the three grades, which is applied to "buildings of national importance and special interest".  The parish is to the northwest of Burton upon Trent, and the listed buildings are mileposts of different styles.


Buildings

References

Citations

Sources

Lists of listed buildings in Staffordshire
 Outwoods